Hessel is a surname. Notable people with the surname include:

Bernd Hessel (born 1961), West German sprint canoeist
Franz Hessel (1880–1941), German author, translator and lecturer
Katja Hessel (born 1972), German politician
Lasse Hessel (born 1940), Danish doctor and inventor
Johann F. C. Hessel (1796–1872), German physician and mineralogist
Katja Hessel (born 1972), German politician
Mats Hessel (born 1961), Swedish ice hockey player
Phoebe Hessel (1713–1812), woman who disguised herself as a man in order to serve in the British Army
Stéphane Hessel (1917–2013), French Resistance fighter, diplomat, and writer

See also 

 Hessel, a river in Germany

German-language surnames
Surnames of German origin
Surnames from given names